2006 FIFA World Cup (known as FIFA World Cup: Germany 2006) is the official video game for the 2006 FIFA World Cup, published by EA Sports. 2006 FIFA World Cup was released simultaneously on all major sixth-generation platforms (Game Boy Advance, GameCube, PlayStation 2 and Xbox), as well as Microsoft Windows, Nintendo DS and Xbox 360 on 24 April 2006, in North America and four days later in Europe, with ports to mobile phones and the PlayStation Portable weeks later.  This was the last game released for the Xbox in Asia.  There are ten region-specific covers that feature a major player from each region.

Microsoft bundled the game with the Xbox 360 in Japan and Europe. It was also bundled with the pre-release order version introduced in India in a World Cup craze. In this featured bundle, there was a limited edition faceplate included from Adidas packaged inside.

Playable teams
The game contains 127 playable teams. Despite licensing issues between EA and the national football associations of Japan and the Netherlands, the two teams are fully licensed with real names and kits. Brazil (1st) were the highest-ranked team in the game, while San Marino (202nd) were the lowest-ranked.
 
Numbers in parentheses are the in-game world rankings of the teams.

Africa

 Algeria (30)
 Angola (88)
 Benin (60)
 Botswana (116)
 Burkina Faso (48)
 Cameroon (19)
 Cape Verde Islands (114)
 Chad1 (143)
 Côte d'Ivoire (27)
 Congo (96)
 Congo DR (103)
 Egypt (12)
 Gabon (42)
 Ghana (32)
 Guinea (87)
 Kenya (113)
 Liberia (150)
 Libya3 (102)
 Malawi (86)
 Mali (54)
 Morocco (70)
 Niger1 (162)
 Nigeria (21)
 Rwanda (107)
 Senegal (75)
 South Africa (83)
 Sudan (118)
 Togo (76)
 Tunisia (55)
 Uganda (73)
 Zambia (71)
 Zimbabwe (110)

 
Asia

 Bahrain (69)
 China PR1 (84)
 Hong Kong1 (140)
 India1 (133)
 Iran (61)
 Iraq3 (80)
 Japan (45)
 Korea DPR (105)
 Korea Republic (47)
 Kuwait (97)
 Pakistan1 (165)
 Saudi Arabia (66)
 Uzbekistan (94)
 Vietnam1 (117)

 
Europe

  (79)
  (201)
  (100)
  (68)
  (109)
  (82)
  (59)
  (51)
  (39)
  (10)
  (67)
  (33)
  (36)
  (8)
  (99)
  (125)
  (52)
 3 (9)
  (120)
 1 (6)
  (13)
  (57)
  (90)
  (26)
  (5)
  (129)
  (46)
  (149)
  (49)
  (127)
  (61)
  (157)
  (89)
  (4)
  (56)
  (22)
  (58)
  (3)
  (41)
  (28)
  (11)
  (202)
  (43)
 2 (15)
  (34)
  (25)
  (2)
  (37)
  (24)
  (29)
  (23)
  (77)

 
North, Central America and Caribbean

 Canada (63)
 Costa Rica (40)
 El Salvador (72)
 Guatemala (114)
 Honduras3 (38)
 Jamaica (81)
 Mexico (17)
 Nicaragua1 (155)
 Panama (74)
 Saint Kitts and Nevis (151)
 Saint Vincent and the Grenadines (163)
 Trinidad and Tobago (95)
 United States (14)

 
South America

 Argentina (7)
 Bolivia (65)
 Brazil (1)
 Chile (18)
 Colombia (35)
 Ecuador (44)
 Paraguay (31)
 Peru (53)
 Uruguay (16)
 Venezuela (49)

 
Oceania

 Australia4 (26)
 Fiji (132)
 New Zealand (78)
 Solomon Islands (170)
 Tahiti (191)
 Vanuatu (153)

 
1 - Must be placed in the qualifiers manually.
3 - Old flags in the game.
4 - Australia are now in the AFC. However, they were part of the OFC at the time.

Gameplay
The game allows players to participate in the 2006 FIFA World Cup held in Germany by taking control of one of 127 national teams. Since the release of the game 2002 FIFA World Cup, the menus have been redesigned and have more options. It even includes a satellite map when choosing countries to play in a Friendly. Online support is provided for ranked and unranked matches on most non-Nintendo platforms. The online service provides lobbies, leaderboards and a global challenge mode where the player can play through over forty historical World Cup scenarios, with the opportunity to explore alternate outcomes for each one.

By playing online and in single-player mode, spending points for the virtual store are earned, where players can purchase uniforms, historical players, various footballs, boots, and gameplay options. As with the previous World Cup video game, matches in World Cup mode are played in the same order as at the World Cup in Germany.

Reception

The PC, Xbox, PlayStation 2 and GameCube versions received "generally favorable reviews", while the Xbox 360, PSP, DS and Game Boy Advance versions received "mixed or average reviews" according to video game review aggregator Metacritic. In Japan, Famitsu gave the PS2 version a score of three eights and one seven for a total of 31 out of 40.

The Times gave the PS2 version a score of four stars out of five and stated that "The classic moment section, which features 125 well-known situations, is one of several nice touches in this game."The A.V. Club gave the game a B and said that it "supplies just enough vicarious excitement to bridge the gap between now and early June." Detroit Free Press gave the X360 version three stars out of four and stated: "Thankfully for the folks at Electronic Arts, the only soccer competition available on the Xbox 360 is the previous FIFA game, and this World Cup edition is a step up from that incarnation, albeit a small one." However, The Sydney Morning Herald gave the game three-and-a-half stars out of five and called it "a fun football simulation for newcomers and the best FIFA of recent years. Even so, competitor "Pro Evolution" still has the virtual World Cup firmly in its grasp."

IGN gave the Mobile version a score of 5.8 out of 10 and called it "a stop-gap product designed to reel in World Cup fans based on the hype of the world's biggest sporting event. And that's not necessarily a bad idea -- having the entire tournament set up from the get-go -- but the execution isn't worth your download dollars."

The game sold 2.8 million copies.

See also
 FIFA 06: Road to FIFA World Cup
 FIFA World Cup video games

References

External links

Video game
FIFA World Cup
EA Sports games
Electronic Arts games
Esports games
World Cup 2006
FIFA World Cup video games
Game Boy Advance games
GameCube games
Nintendo DS games
PlayStation 2 games
PlayStation Portable games
Sports video games set in Germany
Video games developed in Canada
Windows games
Xbox games
Xbox 360 games
Video games set in 2006
Multiplayer and single-player video games
Exient Entertainment games